Riccardo Pizzocaro (26 March 1901 – 17 July 1992) was an Italian wrestler. He competed in the freestyle lightweight event at the 1924 Summer Olympics.

References

External links
 

1901 births
1992 deaths
Olympic wrestlers of Italy
Wrestlers at the 1924 Summer Olympics
Italian male sport wrestlers
Sportspeople from Milan
20th-century Italian people